Corazón Valiente (Fearless Heart), originally known as Caídas del Cielo (Falls of Heaven), is a Spanish-language telenovela produced by United States-based television network Telemundo Studios, Miami, featuring an ensemble cast. Adriana Fonseca, Ximena Duque, José Luis Reséndez and Fabián Ríos starred as the main protagonists, with Aylin Mujica and Manuel Landeta starred as the main antagonists.

Telemundo aired Corazón Valiente weeknights at 9pm/8c from March 6, 2012 to January 7, 2013, replacing Flor Salvaje. On January 8, 2013, La Patrona replaced Corazón Valiente. As with most of its other telenovelas, the network broadcast English subtitles as closed captions on CC3.

Plot 
Corazón valiente is the story of the friendship between two girls in a remote Mexican city called Valle de Bravo. Ángela Valdez (Sofía Sanabria), humble and sweet, was the daughter of Miguel Valdéz (Jorge Luis Pila), the bodyguard of the powerful and wealthy family Sandoval Navarro. Samantha Sandoval Navarro was the rich girl guarded by Miguel Valdéz. The two girls' lives are forever changed when Samantha is kidnapped, resulting in Miguel Valdéz sacrificing his life to save her. After what happened, the girls were separated.

Ángela and Samantha meet again after eighteen years. Ángela (Adriana Fonseca) is married to Luis Martínez (Gabriel Valenzuela); Has a daughter, Violeta (Nicole Arci), and works as a baker. For her part, Samantha (Ximena Duque) works as a bodyguard. Samantha comes up with the idea of inviting Ángela to work with her; Ángela accepts and assigns her the mission to protect Génesis Arroyo, the daughter of a multimillionaire lawyer named Juan Marcos Arroyo (Jose Luis Reséndez) who is unfortunately married to Isabel Uriarte (Sonya Smith), a proud and evil woman who is unfaithful, even with his own bodyguard. Meanwhile, Samantha is ordered to protect Willy del Castillo (Fabián Ríos), her first love, who has become a whimsical playboy and womanizer. Samantha decides not to reveal anything of her past, but he ends up discovering who she is and love arises between them.

Thus, Ángela and Samantha will have to fight with all the obstacles that their enemies will put them through in order to be happy with the people they love, while always having a brave heart.

Cast

Main 

 Adriana Fonseca as Ángela Valdez (Female Protagonist)
 José Luis Reséndez as Juan Marcos Arroyo (Male Protagonist)
 Aylín Mújica as Fernanda del Castillo / Victoria Villafañe (Female antagonist)
 Ximena Duque as Samantha Sandoval Navarro / Samantha Valdéz Navarro (Co-Female Protagonist)
 Fabián Ríos as Guillermo "Willy" del Castillo (Co-Male Protagonist)
 Vanessa Pose as Emma Arroyo
 Jon-Michael Ecker as Pablo Peralta
 Jorge Luis Pila as Miguel Valdéz
 Manuel Landeta as Bernardo del Castillo (Antagonist)
 Katie Barberi as Perla Navarro
 Leonardo Daniel as Darío Sandoval
 Gilda Haddock as Estela de Valdéz (Antagonist)
 Gabriel Valenzuela as Luis Martínez / Camilo Martínez
 José Guillermo Cortines as Renzo Mancilla
 Tatiana Capote as Ofelia Ramírez
 Alejandro López as Vicente La Madrid (Antagonist)
 Lino Martone as Diego Villareal
 Roberto Plantier as Gabriel La Madrid
 Priscila Perales as Nelly Balbuena
 Ahrid Hannaley as Cecilia
 Briggitte Bozzo as Génesis Arroyo
 Nicole Arci as Violeta Martínez
 Carolina Tejera as Lorena Barrios
 Gabriel Porras as Miguel Valdez Gutiérrez
 Brenda Asnicar as Fabiola Arroyo / Fabiola Ferrara
 Angeline Moncayo as Laura Aguilar
 Alba Roversi as Nora / La Madrina
 Daniela Navarro as Clara Salvatierra 
 Pablo Azar as Gustavo Ponte
 Gregorio Pernia as Javier del Toro / El Verdugo / Javier Falcón
 Miguel Varoni as Jesús Matamoros / El Mesiás

Recurring 
 Sandra Beltrán as Ivonne Matamoros / La Niña Bonita (Antagonist)
 Andrés Cotrino as Nicolás del Castillo
 Gabriela Borges as Jessica Águilar del Toro
 Jonathan Freudman as Rodrigo Sandoval
 Eduardo Rodríguez as Esteban de la Vega
 Emily Alvarado as Young Samantha Sandoval
 Ileana Jacket as Josefina Uriarte
 Michelle Jones as Pamela Vallester
 Paloma Márquez as Sol Díaz de León
 Mauro Menendez as Young Jesús Matamoros
 Ezequiel Montalt as Teniente Manuel Flores
 Dayami Padrón as Paloma Nieves
 Tuto Patiño as Cayetano Rodríguez / Ringo
 Francisco Porras as Dante
 María del Pilar Pérez as María Fernanda del Castillo
 Yami Quintero as Fiscal Eugenia de la Salle
 Fernando Cermeño as Gael
 Anthony Sandobal as Juan Cruz Arroyo
 Jamie Sasson as Paula Uriarte
 Eduardo Wasveiler as Juan Ignacio Arroyo
 Zainab Alzaba

Guest 
Sonya Smith as Isabel Uriarte De Arroyo

Awards and nominations

References

External links 
 

2012 American television series debuts
2013 American television series endings
Telemundo telenovelas
2012 telenovelas
Spanish-language American telenovelas